Sunshine is an unincorporated community located in Greenup County, Kentucky, United States.

References

Unincorporated communities in Greenup County, Kentucky
Unincorporated communities in Kentucky